"Silent Kill" is the fifth episode of the first season of the TNT science fiction drama Falling Skies, which originally aired July 10, 2011. The episode was written by Joe Weisberg and directed by Fred Toye.

Tom works up a plan to extract his harnessed son Ben along with the other captive children from the local hospital. Hal comes up with an alternative plan, volunteering to wear Rick's harness and pretend to be a prisoner to rescue Ben.

Plot 
Hal and Margaret return to the High School after scouting the area near the hospital where the drugs they need are kept. They hand the drugs over to Anne for the operations. Anne speaks to Tom about the risks of the procedure, letting him know that there is a chance Ben could die. Tom and Hal go and see Weaver to give him a brief on the situation. Tom tells him that Ben's group is still at the hospital. Tom shows his plan to Weaver on a map.

Anne continues to give water to the Skitter. Dr. Harris doesn't agree that it deserves to be hydrated. While getting food, Margaret meets Sarah, a pregnant civilian.
Later, Scott tells Tom that he can try and pick up a Skitter transmission on his radio as the Skitters communicate using radio waves, as an early warning system that Skitters are nearby.  However, just one Skitter in the hospital will not be transmitting. Weaver hears a record that Scott is playing and it clearly brings up a distasteful memory. He finds it and removes it. The song on the record is "Many Rivers to Cross" by Jimmy Cliff.

Tom and Hal practice shooting targets with crossbows as a crossbow can kill a Skitter silently. Margaret offers her assistance and helps Hal with his aim. She tells Tom that she knows the layout of the hospital where Ben is kept.

Dr. Harris prepares to inject the Skitter with a lethal serum. He fails to do so and the Skitter attacks him. Anne runs to help and gets the Skitter off him but Harris dies immediately. After this, Weaver tells his soldiers that the Skitter needs to die. Anne asks for more time to study it and Weaver gives her 24 hours. Hal speaks to Rick who sits quietly on a bench outside. Hal asks him about the "harness" and the Skitters. Rick tells Hal that if they go and find Ben, they will be killed. Hal then comes up with a new plan for rescuing Ben, wearing a "harness" himself in order to avoid detection. Tom protests against this idea, but Hal convinces him. The pair goes to see Anne, who tells them of the "pressure point" that Dr. Harris found earlier when Mike knocked the Skitter out:  the Skitters have no bone separating the soft palate of their upper mouth from the brain, making it a weak spot.  She tests this theory by shoving her scalpel in its mouth, driving it hard enough that she penetrates the soft tissue into the brain and kills it. Tom speaks to Anne about what happened and she tells him it wasn't hard. She breaks down and tells Tom that she has no picture of her family.

Later that night, Tom, Hal, Dai, Anthony and Margaret arrive at the hospital. The group hides behind a car as Hal, "harnessed", enters the hospital. He finds a group of kids in a group following a Skitter and he joins them, blending in. The kids lie down on the floor to sleep. The Skitter perches itself over them, sheltering the children under its legs like a mother hen, while petting their hair almost as if they are pets. Tom and Margaret enter the hospital in order to save Hal who was now waiting for the right time to attack. He slowly removes the scalpel from his pocket and attacks, but the Skitter fights back, as do the kids. Tom and Margaret find him but cannot shoot as they might miss and hit Hal or one of the kids. Margaret manages to shoot the Skitter with an arrow which distracts it, allowing Hal to successfully stab the Skitter in its mouth and kill it.  The group then escapes, bringing the kids with them.

Anne begins to operate on the six kids. She removes most of the "harnesses" successfully from five, but one child dies. While waiting for news on Ben, Hal sits in the school hallway, when he is visited by Margaret. She tells him that she had cancer when she was younger. Tom later comes to see Hal, telling him how proud of him he is. Weaver plays the record he confiscated from Scott, crying slightly. Anne enters the operating room to find Tom and his sons. Tom thanks Anne for saving Ben’s life. Ben awakes later, apparently recognizing his father.

Production

Development 
Silent Kill was written by Joe Weisberg and directed by Fred Toye. Toye previously directed the fourth episode, Grace. This is the first episode that Joe Weisberg wrote. He later writes the ninth episode, Mutiny.

The scene where Hal enters the hospital with Rick's harness was shot in an abandoned hospital in Toronto. During the scene where the actors had to react to the mech walking by, a crewmember walked through the space with a large pole with a light on it. This gave the actors the basic size and speed to track to. A scene was later shot without the crew member. Whenever the mech was meant to contact the shrubbery, the effects crew attached fishing lines to the bushes, which were shaken in sync with when the interaction was meant to happen.

Reception

Ratings 
In its original American broadcast, "Silent Kill" was seen by an estimated 3.90 million household viewers, according to Nielsen Media Research. The episode received a 1.4 rating among viewers between ages 18 and 49.

Reviews 
Ryan McGee from The A.V. Club gave the episode a B−, stating: "...since this show will certainly have time to improve itself now that there’s definitely a second season, let’s hope the show figures out how to excise what currently holds the show back from being more than simple summer entertainment."

Matt Richenthal of TV Fanatic said: "We're never far removed from the heart of the series. Tom isn't running around screaming, shooting, panicking. He's just a loving father, never failing to be there for his kids, who has been thrust into the role of quasi action hero. He also seems to have come a long way from the premiere, when he said his wife always said the right thing to their sons. Tom did a pretty solid job here with Hal, didn't he?"

References 

2011 American television episodes
Falling Skies (season 1) episodes